The Mseilha Fort is a fortification situated north of the village of Hamat in Lebanon. The current fort was built by Emir Fakhreddine II in the 17th century to guard the route from Tripoli to Beirut. The fort is built on a long, narrow limestone rock near the Nahr el-Jawz River. Its walls are constructed with small sandstone blocks quarried from the nearby coast and built onto the edge of the limestone rock. The thickness of the walls ranges from 1.5 to 2 meters (4 to 6.5 feet). The larger limestone blocks are the only remains of an earlier structure probably built for the same defensive reason.

Architecture and Layout
The fort's architectural design consists of two homogenous sections built in two separate phases. The fort is approached through a narrow path and small stairway cut into the northern side of the bedrock. A small platform precedes the low arched main gate, secured by two loopholes and a small opening in the ceiling above the entrance.

The main gate leads to a vaulted vestibule, followed by a narrow triangular courtyard, giving access to a small one meter (3 feet) wide passageway leading to the archery room of the west tower. At the southern side of the courtyard, two vaulted bays are constructed within a separate architectural block over large underground arched halls used as warehouses and cisterns. This part of the structure has a small apse oriented towards the Qibla (the direction of Mecca, which could have been used as a prayer room by the guards.

The more elevated part of the fort is accessed through the east side of the main courtyard. A doorway leading to a hall, followed by three vaulted rooms, gives access to the eastern tower. An internal stairway leads to the room on the first floor. This section is the most fortified and equipped part of the castle due to its strategic position controlling the entrance of the Nahr el-Jawz valley.

History

Following the collapse of the promontory of Ras Shekka in 551 CE, the coastal road linking the cities of Batroun, El-Heri and Tripoli completely disappeared, transforming the northern shoreline into a high sea cliff. Consequently, a new road bypassing the promontory from the east was necessary to ensure communication between Batroun and the North. Crossing the Nahr el-Jawz valley, this road turns around Ras ech-Chaqa'a promontory to reach the other side at a spot near El-Heri called Bab el-Hawa (meaning the "door of the wind"). Building edified strongholds along this new road was of great strategic and military importance in order to preserve security and ensure communication and traffic control. The Mseilha Fort was built for such purposes.

A number of scholars have studied the history and architecture of Mseilha. Some assume that the rock on which the fort stands was used since ancient times as a military position. However, the fort does not include in its current construction any element related to an earlier period, even the Crusades. The construction techniques, cutting methods, stone block sizes, low arched doors and windows, in addition to the other elements suggest the 17th century as the earliest period for the current structure to have been built. The work of several prominent historians and scholars confirms that the Mseilha Fort is not more than 400 years old. Nineteenth-century French historian Ernest Renan could not relate the architectural elements in Mseilha to anything earlier than the Middle Age. Paul Deschamps, a notable 20th-century historian of Crusader architecture, confirmed the lack of any aspect of Crusader-era work in the fort. Jean de la Roque (a French traveler, 1661–1743) corroborates, after hearing from locals in 1689 that Mseilha was the work of Emir Fakhr ed-Dine II, the former sovereign of Lebanon from 1590–1635. This testimony came almost 50 years after Fakhr ed-Dine's death from locals who witnessed at first hand the fort's construction.

This account is also validated by local chronicles. For example, father Mansour al-Hattouny stated that around 1624, Emir Fakhr ed-Dine ordered Sheikh Abi Nader al-Khazen to build the fort north of Batroun. According to Tannous ach-Chidiaq, another local historian, al-Khazen later restored the fort in 1631, less than 10 years after its initial construction.

Therefore, the year 1624 is established by both historians and eyewitness reports as the construction date of Mseilha by Fakhr ed-Dine II. Further confirmation was attested by Ludwig Burckhardt, who visited the region in the early 19th-century, and dated the fort to a recent period.

Even if the strategic importance of the site was exploited since antiquity, the fort itself cannot be dated earlier that the 17th century.

This disproves the alternative hypothesis, according to which the Mseilha fort was given to the Genoese Embriaco family who ruled over Gibelet by Bertrand de Saint-Gilles in retribution of their service during the taking of Tripoli.

In 2007, restoration works were undertaken to make the site safe for visitors, by building a long fence around the citadel and providing several entrance and exit doors. The foundation of the staircase was consolidated and metal handrails were installed. Works also included landscaping, rain water drains installation to prevent water from leaking into the citadel and repaving the access road to the citadel from the highway nearby.  The windmill located near the fort was also restored. Funded by USAID, these works are a continuation of a project conducted by SRI International-INMA to rehabilitate the fort, in cooperation with the Lebanese Ministry of Tourism and the Ministry of Culture - Directorate General of Antiquities. The restoration of Mseilha, as well as subsequent promotion of the site by the national telecommunication company Ogero, led to a rise in the number of visitors.

References

External links
 Batroun, Tourism at Lebanon.com - photo of castle

Castles in Lebanon
Crusader castles
Tourist attractions in Lebanon
Tourism in Lebanon